A special election for South Carolina's 1st congressional district was held on May 7, 2013, to fill the seat following the resignation of U.S. Representative Tim Scott, who was appointed to the United States Senate by Governor Nikki Haley to fill the seat previously held by Jim DeMint. DeMint resigned from the Senate on January 1, 2013, to accept a position as president of The Heritage Foundation.

The filing period for candidates lasted between January 18 and January 28, 2013. The special primary elections took place on March 19, 2013. Businesswoman Elizabeth Colbert Busch won the Democratic Party primary and Mark Sanford, the former governor of South Carolina who held the seat from 1995 to 2001, advanced to a runoff with former Charleston County Councilman Curtis Bostic for the Republican Party nomination. Prior to the runoff, 14 Republicans and one Democrat signed the "Reject the Debt" pledge put out by the nonpartisan Coalition to Reduce Spending. In the runoff election on April 2, Sanford defeated Bostic. Eugene Platt, a James Island Public Service Commissioner, was nominated by the South Carolina Green Party. In the general election on May 7, Sanford received 54% of the vote, beating Colbert Busch (45%) and Platt (1%).

Republican primary

Candidates

Declared
 Keith Blandford, businessman and Libertarian nominee for this district in 2012
 Curtis Bostic, former Charleston County Councilman (defeated in runoff)
 Ric Bryant, engineer
 Larry Grooms, state senator
 Jonathan Rath Hoffman, former Deputy Assistant Secretary of Homeland Security, former director of border security at the White House
 Jeff King, engineer for a military contractor
 John Kuhn, former state senator
 Tim Larkin, defense engineer and member of the South Carolina Army National Guard
 Chip Limehouse, state representative
 Peter McCoy, state representative
 Elizabeth Moffly, member of the Charleston County School Board
 Ray Nash, former Dorchester County Sheriff
 Andy Patrick, state representative
 Shawn Pinkston, attorney
 Mark Sanford, former Governor of South Carolina and former U.S. Representative (won primary)
 Teddy Turner, high school teacher and son of Ted Turner

Declined
 Carroll Campbell III, businessperson and son of former governor Carroll A. Campbell, Jr.
 George E. Campsen III, state senator
 Tom Davis, state senator
 Larry Kobrovsky, former Charleston County School Board member
 Joe McKeown, chief of staff for Tim Scott and former Charleston County Councilman
 Jimmy Merrill, state representative
 Thomas Ravenel, former state treasurer
 Jenny Sanford, former First Lady of South Carolina
 Duffie Stone, Judicial Circuit Solicitor
 Elliott Summey, Charleston County Councilman
 Paul Thurmond, state senator

Primary

Results

Runoff

Polling

Results

Democratic primary

Candidates

Declared
 Elizabeth Colbert Busch, director of business development at Clemson University’s Restoration Institute, (won primary; also nominated by the South Carolina Working Families Party)
 Ben Frasier, perennial candidate, former aide to Congressman L. Mendel Rivers

Withdrawn
 Bobbie Rose, former teacher and nominee for the 1st district in 2012
 Martin Skelly, businessperson

Declined
 Robert Burton, pilot and retired Air Force Colonel
 Wendell Gilliard, state representative
 Blaine Lotz, Chairman of the Beaufort County Democratic Party
 Leon Stavrinakis, state representative

Primary

Results

Green Party

On the Ballot
 Eugene Platt, James Island Public Service Commissioner and 1990 Democratic Party candidate for the 1st district (won primary)

Declared
 Larry Carter Center, political activist

General election
On May 7, 2013, Mark Sanford won the election and took the seat vacated by U.S. Representative Tim Scott.

Polling

Results

County results

References

External links
 Elizabeth Colbert Busch for Congress
 Eugene Platt for Congress
 Mark Sanford for Congress

South Carolina 2013 01
South Carolina 2013 01
2013 01
South Carolina 01
United States House of Representatives 01
United States House of Representatives 2013 01